Wolfgang Katschner (born 1961 in Kyritz) is a German lutenist and conductor. He is director of the ensembles Capella Angelica and Lautten Compagney which specialise in Baroque music—notably the operas of Handel.

Katschner studied guitar at the Academy of Music Hanns Eisler Berlin and lute at the University of Music and Performing Arts, Frankfurt am Main.

The Lautten Compagney won the Rheingau Music Prize in 2012. In 2013 they played the annual Marienvesper of the Rheingau Musik Festival at Eberbach Abbey, Monteverdi's Vespers with the ensemble amarcord and five guest singers.

Katschner also directed the Philip Glass Ensemble and the Lautten Compagney for several recordings of compositions by Philip Glass.

Selected discography 
For recordings with the Lautten Compagney, see there.
 Johann Philipp Krieger: Lieben und geliebt werden Arias, Mona Spägele, Wilfried Jochens, Wolf Matthias Friedrich, New Classical Adventure, 1995
 Songs of an English cavalier, works by John Dowland, Thomas Campion, Henry Lawes, John Blow, Henry Purcell. Kobie van Rensburg, New Classical Adventure, 2001
 Handel's Beard, Kobie van Rensburg, New Classical Adventure, 2001
 Dolce mio ben, arias by Gasparini, Conti, Magini, Pistocchi, Sarri. Maite Beaumont, Berlin 2003
 My personal Handel collection, Lynne Dawson, Berlin Classics, 2003
 Handel: La Diva - Arias for Cuzzoni, Simone Kermes. Berlin Classics
 Mia Vita, Mio Bene, Ann Hallenberg and Ditte Andersen Berlin Classics, 2006
 Handel arias, Maria Ricarda Wesseling, Claves Records, 2005
 Il pianto d'Orfeo, Kobie van Rensburg, New Classical Adventure 2006
 Henry Purcell: Love Songs. Dorothee Mields, Carus Verlag, 2010
 Henry Purcell: Love's Madness. Dorothee Mields, Carus Verlag, 2012

References

External links 
 Lautten Compagney official website

German lutenists
German male conductors (music)
1961 births
Living people
Handel Prize winners
21st-century German conductors (music)
21st-century German male musicians